In mathematics, the Perkel graph, named after Manley Perkel, is a 6-regular graph with 57 vertices and 171 edges. It is the unique distance-regular graph with intersection array (6, 5, 2; 1, 1, 3). The Perkel graph is also distance-transitive.
 
It is also the skeleton of an abstract regular polytope, the 57-cell.

References

 Brouwer, A. E. Perkel Graph. .
 Brouwer, A. E.; Cohen, A. M.; and Neumaier, A. The Perkel Graph for L(2,19). 13.3 in Distance Regular Graphs. New York: Springer-Verlag, pp. 401–403, 1989. 
 Perkel, M. Bounding the Valency of Polygonal Graphs with Odd Girth. Can. J. Math. 31, 1307-1321, 1979. 
Dedicata 9, 291-298, 1980.

External links 
 

Individual graphs
Regular graphs